H. M. Dharmasiri Bandara Herath (born 23 May 1956) is a Sri Lankan politician, Member of Parliament and state minister.

Herath was born on 23 May 1956. He was a member of the North Western Provincial Council and Minister Agriculture for the North Western Province.

He contested the 2015 parliamentary election as one of the United People's Freedom Alliance (UPFA) electoral alliance's candidates in Kurunegala District but failed to get elected after coming 10th amongst the UPFA candidates. However, following the death of Salinda Dissanayake, he was appointed to the Parliament of Sri Lanka in September 2019. He was re-elected at the 2020 parliamentary election as a Sri Lanka People's Freedom Alliance electoral alliance candidate. After the election he was appointed State Minister of Livestock, Farm Promotion and Dairy and Egg Related Industries.

References

1956 births
Agriculture ministers of Sri Lankan provinces
Living people
Members of the 15th Parliament of Sri Lanka
Members of the 16th Parliament of Sri Lanka
Members of the North Western Province Board of Ministers
Sinhalese politicians
Sri Lankan Buddhists
Sri Lanka People's Freedom Alliance politicians
Sri Lanka Podujana Peramuna politicians
State ministers of Sri Lanka
United People's Freedom Alliance politicians